Coin Street Community Builders (CSCB) is a development trust and social enterprise which seeks to make London's South Bank a better place in which to live, to work, to visit and to study. Since 1984 CSCB has transformed a largely derelict 13-acre site into a thriving mixed-use neighbourhood.

History
Since its creation in 1984, CSCB redeveloped the Oxo Tower Wharf, Gabriel's Wharf, Bernie Spain Gardens and set up four housing co-operatives (Mulberry, Palm, Redwood and Iroko). The housing co-operatives are housed in new buildings commissioned by CSCB. Palm (also known as Broadwall) was designed by Lifschutz Davidson (now Lifschutz Davidson Sandilands) completed in 1994. Iroko was designed by architects Haworth Tompkins and was completed in 2001.

In 2007, CSCB occupied new offices at the Coin Street neighbourhood centre, also designed by Haworth Tompkins. As well as offices the building includes a day nursery and crèche, conference and meeting facilities.

CSCB also offers a variety of community programmes for people of all ages including youth clubs, sports and dance sessions and family and children's activities

CSCB opposed the Garden Bridge project which would have been partially built on their land.

Management
The Group Chairman is Dr Scott Rice.
The Group Director is Iain Tuckett.

References

External links
 Coin Street Community Builders
 Coin Street — case study by Andrew Bibby
 Heart of gold article from The Guardian
 Haworth Tompkins Architects

1984 establishments in England
Politics of the London Borough of Southwark
Housebuilding companies of the United Kingdom
Property companies of the United Kingdom
Companies based in the London Borough of Lambeth
Housing in London
History of the London Borough of Lambeth
Redevelopment projects in London
Construction and civil engineering companies of England
Private companies limited by guarantee of England
British companies established in 1984
Construction and civil engineering companies established in 1984